Greater Madawaska is an incorporated township in Renfrew County in eastern Ontario, Canada, created on January 1, 2001, through the amalgamation of the Township of Bagot and Blythfield; the Township of Brougham; and the Township of Griffith and Matawatchan. , it has a population of 2,518.

Geography
The township is composed of the geographic townships of Bagot, Blythfield (also spelled Blithfield), Brougham, Griffith and Matawatchan. The township borders in downstream order Centennial Lake, Black Donald Lake, Norcan Lake and Calabogie Lake, all four on the Madawaska River, and is located in the northern section of the Ottawa River Valley.

Communities
The largest communities in the township are the villages of Calabogie and Griffith.  The municipal offices are located in Calabogie.  Other communities in the township include Ashdad, Barrett Chute, Barryvale, Black Donald, Camel Chute, Hurds Lake, Lower Dacre, Matawatchan, Mount St. Patrick, Springtown, Spruce Hedge and Wilson.

The ghost towns of Khartum and Balvenie are also located in the township.

Two fire towers were located in the township in the middle of the 20th century. These were located at Jameison's Mountain north of Griffith (the cupola now sits on the property of the Pembroke MNR office) and at Matawatchan. These were put out of use in 1970 as aerial forest fire fighting techniques took over.

Demographics 

Recreation
The Calabogie Peaks ski resort is located in the township. The Kingston and Pembroke Railway ran through the town, with stations at Ashdad and Calabogie, until it was abandoned in 1986. It has now become a hiking trail, the K&P Rail Trail. The Calabogie Motorsports Park is a racing venue that hosts regional road racing and is the main circuit in the Ottawa metropolitan area.

In film

 Much of the National Film Board's classic 1968 film The Best Damn Fiddler from Calabogie to Kaladar was shot on farmland around Barryvale.

Image gallery

See also
List of townships in Ontario

References

External links

Lower-tier municipalities in Ontario
Municipalities in Renfrew County
Township municipalities in Ontario